Albert Wolfgang, Count of Hohenlohe-Langenburg (6 July 1659, in Langenburg – 17 April 1715, in Langenburg) was the oldest child of Count Henry Frederick of Hohenlohe-Langenburg (1625–1699) and his second wife Countess Juliana Dorothea of Castell-Remlingen (1640–1706).

He was head of the House of Hohenlohe-Langenburg and introduced primogeniture in Langenburg in 1699.  This meant the oldest son would inherit the entire county, and younger sons would only inherit if the oldest were to die childless.  From then on, younger sons would mostly embark on military careers, for example, in the imperial army, or in friendly nations.

Marriage and issue
On 22 August 1686 he married Countess Sophia Amalia (1666–1736), daughter of Count Gustav Adolf of Nassau-Saarbrücken.  They had the following children:
 Eleonora Juliana (1687–1701)
 Frederick Louis (1688-1688)
 Sophie Charlotte (1690–1691)
 Philip (1692–1699)
 Christiana (1693–1695)
 Louis (1696–1765), married Countess Eleonore of Nassau-Saarbrücken (1707–1769)
 Charlotte (1697–1743)
 Christian (1699–1719)
 Albertina (1701–1773), married Prince Philip Henry of Hohenlohe-Ingelfingen (1702–1781)
 Sophie Friederike (1702–1734)
 Henrietta (1704–1709)
 Charles Frederick (1706–1718)

Counts of Hohenlohe
House of Hohenlohe
People from Langenburg
1659 births
1715 deaths
17th-century German people
18th-century German people